The 1948 Yugoslav First Basketball League season is the 4th season of the Yugoslav First Basketball League, the highest professional basketball league in SFR Yugoslavia.

The competition was held as a six-team tournament held in Belgrade.

Regular season

League table

Winning Roster  
The winning roster of Crvena Zvezda:
  Nebojša Popović
  Aleksandar Gec
  Milorad Sokolović
  Srđan Kalember
  Milan Bjegojević
  Vasilije Stojković
  Dragan Godžić
  Ladislav Demšar
  Strahinja Alagić
  Borislav Stanković
  Aleksandar Nikolić
  Milan Blagojević
  Hristofer Dimitrijević
  Rade Jovanović
  Đorđe Lazić

Coach:  Nebojša Popović

External links  
 Yugoslav First Basketball League Archive 

1948